Tyrese Jay Francois (born 16 July 2000) is an Australian professional soccer player who plays as a midfielder for English Premier League club Fulham.

Early life
Tyrese was born in Campbelltown, New South Wales, located on the outskirts of the metropolitan area of Sydney, Australia. He is of Mauritian descent through his father, and English descent through his mother. At the age of 5, he joined Campbelltown Uniting Church Soccer Club, and later moved to Camden Tigers. He also trained under Andrea Icardi at the AC Milan Academy Australia. In 2013, Tyrese and his family moved to London, England, where he and his brother Marlee Francois joined the Fulham F.C. Academy system.

Club career
On 27 August 2019, he made his professional debut for Fulham in an EFL Cup tie against Southampton. On 1st September 2022 Francois joined Croatian team HNK Gorica on a season long loan from Fulham. He played his first game coming off the bench on 3 September in a 2–1 defeat to NK Varaždin.

International career
Francois was called up to the senior Australia squad for two friendly matches against New Zealand in September 2022.

Career statistics

References

External links
Profile at the Fulham F.C. website

2000 births
Living people
Australian soccer players
Australian expatriate sportspeople in England
Association football midfielders
Australian people of Mauritian descent
Australian people of English descent
Fulham F.C. players
Premier League players
English Football League players

Australian expatriate sportspeople in Croatia